Lord Tweedsmuir Secondary is a public high school in the Vancouver suburb of Surrey, British Columbia, Canada and is part of School District 36 Surrey. In September 1993, staff and students from Cloverdale Junior Secondary and Lord Tweedsmuir Senior Secondary joined together to form Lord Tweedsmuir Secondary, and moved into the new TWEED. Lord Tweedsmuir's name has been attached to a school in the Cloverdale area since 1940 when Canada's Governor General, John Buchan, Lord Tweedsmuir of Elsfield died.

The school's mascot is a Panther. The school is sport rivals with the other nearby secondary schools, École Salish Secondary School and Clayton Heights Secondary School. The average class size is 23.5 students.

Programs 
Lord Tweedsmuir Secondary School offers many programs to its students and teachers.

• Choice Program 

• School Meal Programs

• Aboriginal Programs

• Online & Distance Learning {SAIL}

• Special Needs Support

-And Much More

School Clubs  
• School Library Team Of Volunteers

• Student Council 

• Mindfulness Club

• Ad Astra 

• Botany Club

• Debate Club

Athletic Achievements 
 2001-02  District Hockey Champions
 2014- Cod champs 1976- B.C. Rugby Champions
 2016 -2017 AAA Senior Girls Basketball Provincial Champions
 2016 -2017 Junior Boys Football Provincial Champions
 2018 -2019 AAA Senior Boys Basketball Provincial Champions

Notable alumni 
Laine MacNeil, actress
 Matthew Stowe, winner of Top Chef Canada (season 3)

External links

References 

 
20-21 Code of Conduct

High schools in Surrey, British Columbia
Educational institutions established in 1946
1946 establishments in British Columbia